Ingeborg is a Scandinavian feminine given name.

Ingeborg may also refer to:

 Ingeborg (singer), Belgian singer and television presenter Ingeborg Sergeant
 Ingeborg (film), a 1960 West German comedy
 391 Ingeborg, an asteroid discovered by Max Wolf in 1894
 Ingeborg (hulk), a ship hulked at Göteborg, Sweden, from 1972 to 1974

See also
 Ingeborg Psalter, a late 12th century illuminated psalter